North Korea competed as the Democratic People's Republic of Korea at the 2000 Summer Olympics in Sydney, Australia.  Athletes from North and South Korea marched together in the opening ceremony under the Unification Flag of Korea.

Medalists

Results by event

Archery

North Korea sent only one woman to the archery competition in Sydney.  She was undefeated until her semifinal match with an archer from South Korea.  She also lost her bronze medal match, again to a South Korean archer.

Athletics
Men's marathon
 Kim Jung-Won
 Final – 2:18:04 (29th place)
 Kim Jong-Chol
 Final – 2:18:04 (30th place)
 Kil Jae-Son
 Final – 2:25:13 (59th place)

Women's Marathon
 Ham Bong-Sil
 Final – 2:27:07 (8th place)
 Jong Yong-Ok
 Final – 2:31:40 (20th place)
 Kim Chang-Ok
 Final – 2:35:32 (28th place)

Boxing
Men's Light Flyweight (– 48 kg)
Un Chol Kim – Bronze Medal
Round 1 – Defeated Sebusiso Keketsi of Lesotho
Round 2 – Defeated Pál Lakatos of Hungary
Quarterfinal – Defeated Ivanas Stapovičius of Lithuania
Semifinal – Lost to Rafael Lozano of Spain

Diving
Men's 3 Metre Springboard
 Yong – Ryong Pak
 Preliminary – 271.47 (47th place, did not advance)

Men's 10 Metre Platform
 Hyong – Gil Choe
 Preliminary – 448.41
 Semi-final – 185.52 – 633.93
 Final – 377.46 – 562.98 (12th place)

Men's 10 Metre Platform
 Yong – Ryong Pak
 Preliminary – 400.29
 Semi-final – 181.74 – 582.03 (16th place, did not advance)

Women's 3 Metre Springboard
 Ok Rim Ri
 Preliminary – 238.77 (26th place, did not advance)

Women's 3 Metre Springboard
 Song Hui Choe
 Preliminary – 222.84 (33rd place, did not advance)

Women's 10 Metre Platform
 Ok Rim Ri
 Preliminary – 262.20 (22nd place, did not advance)

Women's 10 Metre Platform
 Myong Hwa Choe
 Preliminary – 308.73
 Semi-final – 183.84 – 492.57
 Final – 269.22 – 453.06 (10th place)

Synchronized swimming
Duet
 Son Yong Choe, Yong Hui Jo
 Technical Routine – 29.867 Did not compete in free routine

Weightlifting

Women

Wrestling

References

Works cited

Further reading
 

Korea, North
2000
2000 in North Korean sport